Clonezilla is a suite of open source drive cloning, drive imaging and system deployment utilities used to simplify deployment and maintenance of a group of computers. Clonezilla Server Edition uses multicast technologies to deploy a single image file to a group of computers on a local area network. Clonezilla was designed by Steven Shiau and developed by the NCHC Free Software Labs in Taiwan.

Clonezilla is used to deploy operating systems to computers by imaging a single computer and then deploying that image to one or more systems. It integrates several other open-source programs to provide cloning and imaging capabilities.

Variants 
Clonezilla works by copying used blocks on the storage device (i.e. SATA SSD, HDD or NVMe SSD). It is intended to support a bare-metal deployment of an operating systems by booting from a preinstalled live environment. The preinstallation environment can be booted from a USB flash drive, CD/DVD-ROM or Android mobile phone. It uses Partclone, Ntfsclone and Partimage to image the drive either over the network or to a locally-attached hard disk drive.

There are two variants of Clonezilla: Clonezilla Live is intended to be used for imaging a single computer, while Clonezilla Server Edition (SE) is intended for mass deployment over a computer network.

Clonezilla Live 

Clonezilla Live can image a single computer's storage media or a single partition on the media to an image file stored on a SSH server, Samba network share, locally-attached hard disk drive or to a network filesystem file-share. Alternatively, Clonezilla Live can clone the data on one storage medium to another without the need to create an image file first. Image files can be deployed to the same or different computers as required.

Unlike Acronis Cyber Protect Home Office and Norton Ghost, Clonezilla lacks an agent that can be installed into the operating system. Instead, Clonezilla was designed under the assumption that the disk should be cloned without interfering with the operating system. It is booted from a preinstallation environment and operations are performed within a consistent environment.

Clonezilla Server Edition (SE) 
Clonezilla Server Edition (SE) can clone many computers at the same time using multicast technology over a computer network. Multicast support is provided by UDPCast tool.

Since such an environment is difficult to configure, users can download a Live disk that provides the operating system with all the necessary configurations already done. Images are uploaded to an image repository configured by the user, which may be a local directory on the same server as Clonezilla SE or a remote location such as a network-attached storage that is accessed using SSH or Samba.

Effectiveness 
Clonezilla is an effective tool for deploying software in training laboratories. Clonezilla can sometimes be faster than proprietary solutions (i.e. Norton Ghost, DriveImage XML, Macrium Reflect, and Active Disk Image) for both full image backup and restoration but can be difficult to configure. Clonezilla lacks incremental and differential backup support (which may make deployment slower).

Features

Filesystem copying 
Clonezilla uses information from the filesystem to determine which blocks on a drive require copying. This ensures that only the space currently in use on the drive is copied while empty space is ignored. Clonezilla supports several filesystems including: Linux-based filesystems (Ext2, Ext3, Ext4, ReiserFS, XFS, JFS and Btrfs); Windows (NTFS and FAT); LVM2 and some hardware RAID chip sets. When an unsupported filesystem is imaged or cloned, Clonezilla falls back to copying the data using dd. The master boot record and other drive metadata is copied using dd by Clonezilla before using PartClone, PartImage or NtfsClone to copy the appropriate filesystem.

Compression 
Clonezilla images can be split into smaller files and compressed to save space on the destination drive.

PXE booting 
Clonezilla can be booted over a computer network using PXE booting techniques.

See also 
Partclone
Partimage
FSArchiver
Redo Rescue, formerly Redo Backup and Recovery, is a free backup and disaster recovery software partly based on Clonezilla.

References

External links

 
Rescuezilla is an open-source disk imaging app with a graphical user interface that is fully compatible with Clonezilla.

Backup software for Linux
Cross-platform software
Disk cloning
Free backup software
Free data recovery software
Free software programmed in Perl
Free system software
Operating system distributions bootable from read-only media